The 1862 Connecticut gubernatorial election was held on April 7, 1862. It was a rematch of the 1861 Connecticut gubernatorial election. Incumbent governor and Republican nominee William Alfred Buckingham defeated Democratic nominee James Chaffee Loomis with 56.48% of the vote.

As this was the first gubernatorial election held following the start of the American Civil War, a Unionist party convention (called the "Union Party of Connecticut") was held in Hartford on January 8, 1862. James T. Pratt, the Democratic nominee in both the 1858 and 1859 elections, presided. Tennessee Senator Andrew Johnson was supposed to attend, and made it as close as New York City, but was called to Kentucky at the last minute to participate in the movement of troops there.

This convention endorsed a fusion ticket of both Republicans and War Democrats, and adopted resolutions supporting the Union side and eliminating traditional party labels. The Republican convention held on January 16, 1862, endorsed the same candidates, who went on to win the election. As a result, Republican governor Buckingham was re-elected, and Roger Averill, previously a Democrat, was elected Lieutenant Governor of Connecticut.

General election

Candidates
Major party candidates

William Alfred Buckingham, Republican & Unionist
James Chaffee Loomis, Democratic

Results

References

1862
Connecticut
Gubernatorial